Gwilym Simcock (born 24 February 1981) is a Welsh pianist and composer working in both jazz and classical music, often blurring any distinction between the two musical forms.

Simcock was chosen as one of the 1000 Most Influential People in London by the Evening Standard. He was featured on the front cover of the August 2007 issue of the UK's Jazzwise Magazine.

Early life 
Simcock was born in Bangor, Gwynedd. At the age of eleven he attained the highest marks in the country for his Associated Board Grade 8 exams – on both piano and French horn. He studied classical piano, French horn and composition at Chetham's School, Manchester, where he was introduced to jazz by pianist and teacher Les Chisnall and bassist and teacher Steve Berry. He studied jazz piano at The Royal Academy of Music, London with John Taylor, Nikki Iles, Nick Weldon and Geoff Keezer.

He graduated from the Royal Academy of Music with a first-class honours degree and the "Principal's Prize' for outstanding achievement. Whilst at the Royal Academy of Music he studied with many renowned musicians including Milton Mermikides.

Career 
In 2006, he was the first jazz musician to be selected for the BBC Radio 3 New Generation Artists scheme, and this was extended to 2008. It involved numerous broadcasts on BBC Radio 3 as solo performances, and his trio appearance at the Wigmore Hall during the London Jazz Festival 2006 (broadcast 7 July 2007).

In 2008, he was commissioned to perform at The Proms at the Royal Albert Hall in London. He composed a Piano Concerto "Progressions" which he performed with his trio and the BBC Concert Orchestra on 9 August 2008, broadcast live on the television channel BBC Two.

On 5 October 2008, he was featured in an evening at the King's Place Opening Festival in which he performed four concerts leading four different groups including a duo with John Taylor.

His trio, which has performed at festivals and venues worldwide such as the North Sea Jazz Festival 2007, now features James Maddren (drums) and Yuri Goloubev (bass), while his debut album featured Stan Sulzmann, John Parricelli, Phil Donkin, Martin France and Ben Bryant.

He was chosen by Chick Corea for a solo concert performance and live recording at Klavier Festival Ruhr 2007. This concert was broadcast on WDR radio and 20,000 copies were given away as a cover mount CD in Germany's leading music magazine Fonoforum.

In 2011 his album Good Days At Schloss Elmau was one of the twelve nominees for the Mercury Music Prize, ultimately losing to PJ Harvey's Let England Shake.

He was a member of Tim Garland's Lighthouse Trio, however left in 2013 being replaced by John Turville. He was a member of Malcolm Creese's Acoustic Triangle, Stan Sulzmann's Neon, and Bill Bruford's Earthworks. He has also played with musicians including Dave Holland, Lee Konitz, Bob Mintzer, Bobby McFerrin, Kenny Wheeler, Iain Ballamy, Julian Argüelles, Pete King, Don Weller, Steve Waterman, and Torsten de Winkel / New York Jazz Guerrilla. He is a founder member of The Impossible Gentlemen.

He also plays French horn and has played with the National Youth Jazz Orchestra (NYJO), the BBC Big Band, and with Kenny Wheeler on his 2003/2005 tour.

In recent times he has been on tour with legendary US guitarist Pat Metheny in a quartet featuring Linda Oh and Antonio Sanchez.

Commissions/collaborations 
 A commission to compose and perform a piano concerto with the BBC Concert Orchestra at the Proms 2008 at the Royal Albert Hall in London (Progressions)
 A commission for a new work for the Aronowitz Ensemble at the City of London Festival, July 2008
 A commission and recording for a piano concerto with big band with the NDR Big Band in Germany (Hamburg Suite)
 A Big Band project at Cheltenham Jazz Festival 2007, broadcast on BBC Radio on 1 June 2007 (The Lichfield Suite)
 A 2007 commission and tour with The Scottish Ensemble (Chamber Orchestra), broadcast on 1 July 2007 on BBC Radio Scotland and again on BBC Radio 3 on 12 October
 Guest soloist on Mark Antony Turnage's commission with London Sinfonietta for the re-opening of the Southbank Centre at Queen Elizabeth Hall, June 2007
 A commission for the Britten Sinfonia, premiered at the London Jazz Festival 2007 (Jackie's Dance)
 New Horn Sonata performed at the Wigmore Hall with French horn player Chris Parkes
 Performed the première of Tim Garland's piano concerto with the Northern Sinfonia, May 2005
 A commission and major Arts Council-funded tour of cathedrals with Acoustic Triangle and Sacconi Strings, 2008
 Performing with his trio at the BBC Young Musician of the Year Jazz Award 2014 and 2016 with the finalists of the competition

Awards and nominations 
 Winner of Perrier Award 2001: Young Jazz Ensemble
 Winner of BBC Jazz Award 2005: Rising Star
 Winner of British Jazz Award 2005: Rising Star
 Nominated for Parliamentary Jazz Awards 2007: Jazz Musician of the Year
 Nominated for BBC Jazz Award 2008: Best Instrumentalist
 Nominated for BBC Jazz Award 2008: Best Album
 BBC Radio 3 New Generation Artist 2006–2008
 Nominated for Radio 3 Listeners' Awards 2008
 Nominated for Barclaycard Mercury Music Prize 2011

Discography

As sideman
 Catalyst – Acoustic Triangle (Audio B, 2003)
 Close to You – Kathleen Willison (Basho, 2004)
 Resonance – Acoustic Triangle (Audio B, 2005)
 If the Sea Replied – Tim Garland (Sirocco Music, 2005)
 Take me home – Kaz Simmons (33 Jazz Records, 2005)
 Heart Luggage – Klaus Gesing (ATS Records, 2006)
 Sax of Gold – Sax Assault (Astute Music, 2007)
 Traces – Dan Stern (Kvetch, 2007)
 Due North – Tim Garland (Jazzaction, 2007)
 Reverence – Spike Wells (Audio-B, 2007)
 Video Anthology Vol. 1: 2000's – Bill Bruford's Earthworks (Summerfold Records, 2007)
 SGS Group, Inc. Presents – Simcock – Goloubev – Sirkis (Music Center, 2008)
 Give It One – London Horn Sound (Cala, 2008)
 Smoke and Mirrors – Tom Richards Orchestra (Candid, 2008)
 3 Dimensions – Acoustic Triangle (Audio B, 2008)
 Finally Beginning – John Warren (Fuzzy Moon, 2008)
 Bimbache Jazz & Raíces – La Condición Humana (nyjg / ESC, 2008)
 Howeird – Sam Crockatt Quartet (Loop, 2009)
 Metafore Semplici – Yuri Goloubev (Universal, 2009)
 Libra – Tim Garland (Global Mix, 2009)
 Following On – John Warren (Fuzzy Moon, 2009)
 The Impossible Gentlemen - (Basho records, 2011)
 Internationally Recognised Aliens - (Basho records, 2013)
 Let's Get Deluxe - (Basho records, 2016)
 From This Place - Pat Metheny (Nonesuch Records, 2020)

As leader
 Perception (Basho, 2007)
 Blues Vignette (Basho, 2009)
 Good Days At Schloss Elmau (ACT Music 2011)
 Instrumation  (ACT Music 2014)
 Reverie at Schloss Elmau  Gwilym Simcock  / Yuri Goloubev (ACT Music 2014)
Birdsong; Kizzy Crawford / Gwilym Simcock (Basho 2018)
 Near and Now (ACT Music 2019)

References

Other sources 
 http://www.spiegel.de/kultur/musik/0,1518,537613,00.html
 https://web.archive.org/web/20080222093747/http://www.br-online.de/bayern4/sendungen/jazz/
 http://www.birminghampost.net/life-leisure-birmingham-guide/birmingham-culture/classical-music-birmingham/2007/11/29/britten-sinfonia-uncovers-hidden-treasure-65233-20180607/

External links 
 
 Profile on Basho Records website
 Gwilym Simcock biography from BBC Wales
 Profile at BBC Wales North West

1981 births
Living people
Welsh jazz pianists
Welsh classical pianists
Male classical pianists
Third stream pianists
Welsh jazz composers
Welsh classical composers
21st-century classical composers
Alumni of the Royal Academy of Music
People educated at Chetham's School of Music
People from Bangor, Gwynedd
Welsh male classical composers
BBC Radio 3 New Generation Artists
British male pianists
21st-century classical pianists
Male jazz composers
21st-century British male musicians
Earthworks (band) members
ACT Music artists
21st-century jazz composers
Basho Records artists